Charles Oakley (born December 18, 1963) is an American former professional basketball player. Oakley played most of 19 seasons in the National Basketball Association with the New York Knicks. As a power forward, he consistently ranked as one of the best rebounders and defensive players in the NBA. He also played for the Chicago Bulls, Toronto Raptors, Washington Wizards, and Houston Rockets. Since 2017, he has been the coach of the Killer 3's of the BIG3.

Early life and college career
Born and raised in Cleveland, Oakley attended John Hay High School and Virginia Union University, a Division II historically black university in Richmond, Virginia. As a senior in 1984–85, Oakley led Virginia Union to the 1985 NCAA championship. The Panthers had a 31–1 overall record that year, with Oakley averaging 24 points and 17.3 rebounds a game. Oakley was named the NCAA Division II Player of the Year. He scored 2,379 points and grabbed 1,642 rebounds in his college career.

Professional career

Chicago Bulls (1985–1988) 
Oakley was drafted with the 9th overall pick in the 1985 NBA draft by the Cleveland Cavaliers, but his draft rights were traded to the Chicago Bulls. Oakley provided another scoring option and steady offensive and defensive performances to an up-and-coming Bulls squad led by Michael Jordan. On March 15, 1986, Oakley set a career high in points scored with 35, during a 125-116 loss to the Milwaukee Bucks. Oakley was selected as a part of the NBA All-Rookie First Team in 1986.

Oakley also assumed the role of the team "enforcer", whose duty primarily was to protect young Jordan against cheap shots and roughhousing tactics of opposing players. He was given the nickname, "Oak Tree", for his rugged demeanor and no-nonsense attitude. On April 26, 1987, Oakley set a postseason career high with 25 points scored, alongside grabbing 15 rebounds, in a loss to the Boston Celtics.

New York Knicks (1988–1998)
With the drafting and development of Horace Grant, the Bulls traded Oakley to the New York Knicks for 7'1" center Bill Cartwright. Oakley eventually became a part of the core which the Knicks built around, which also featured Patrick Ewing, John Starks, Anthony Mason and point guard Mark Jackson.

During the Knicks' 1994 season, which included a record 25 playoff games, Oakley started every regular season and playoff game for a record 107 starts in a single season. On June 1, 1994, Oakley scored 12 points, grabbed 13 rebounds and recorded 7 assists in a Game 5 loss to the Indiana Pacers in the Eastern Conference Finals. The Knicks eventually won that series. The following round, during that year's NBA Finals, Oakley averaged 11 points and 11.9 rebounds per game in a tightly contested seven game series loss to the Houston Rockets.

On March 11, 1998, Oakley grabbed a season high 22 rebounds in a loss against former teammate Anthony Mason and the Charlotte Hornets. Despite regular season success and consistent playoffs appearances, the Knicks did not return to the Finals again during Oakley's tenure. During his time with the Knicks, Oakley was known across the league for being a defensive specialist and outstanding rebounder.

Toronto Raptors (1998–2001)
In 1998, Oakley was traded by New York to the Toronto Raptors for blossoming star Marcus Camby. For the Raptors, he provided a veteran presence to a young team that included Vince Carter and Tracy McGrady. On January 7, 2001, Oakley set a career high with 6 blocks, and also nearly missed a triple-double with 12 points, 10 rebounds, and 7 assists.

Return to Chicago (2001–2002)
In 2001, Oakley was traded by the Toronto Raptors with a 2002 2nd-round pick to the Chicago Bulls for Brian Skinner. This was his second tenure with the Bulls. Starting 36 of his 57 played games, he averaged 3.8 points per game, 6 rebounds per game, and 2 assists per game.

Washington Wizards (2002–2003)
In 2002, Oakley signed as a free agent with the Washington Wizards, where he was reunited with former teammate Michael Jordan. Oakley played 42 games during the 2002–03 season, averaging 1.8 points per game, 2.5 rebounds per game, and 1 assist per game.

Houston Rockets (2004) 
The 2003–04 season was Oakley's last season. On March 18, 2004, Oakley signed the first of two 10-day contracts with the Houston Rockets. Oakley played only 7 games, in which he averaged 1.3 points per game, 0.7 rebounds per game, and 0.3 assists per game. At the end of the season, Oakley retired from the NBA.

In 2007 Oakley was reported to be attempting an NBA comeback, at age 44. He claimed Dallas, Miami, Cleveland and New York were interested, but said he would "not [come] back cheap".

Coaching and businesses
On December 26, 2010, Oakley was hired as an assistant coach for the Charlotte Bobcats under then-head coach Paul Silas.

He left that position on December 1, 2011 after experiencing health issues with back pain, during the 2010–11 season.

Oakley owns several commercial enterprises, including: 
 Hair Solutions and Nails EtCetera in east Cleveland, Ohio, "salons started with seed money from Oakley and run by his sisters"
 Oakley's car wash, oil change, and detail centers in Brighton Beach, Brooklyn and Yonkers, New York
 Oakley's Wash House, a combination car wash and laundromat Oakley founded in east Cleveland, Ohio, overseen by his sister Carolyn and mother Corine
 Red, The Steakhouse, restaurants in Cleveland, Ohio and South Beach, Miami, Florida

Legacy
Oakley was inducted into the Virginia Sports Hall of Fame and Museum in honor of his 19-year professional basketball career. The induction ceremony was held on April 30, 2016.

In September 2016, a portion of Deering Street in Oakley's hometown of Cleveland (near his alma mater of John Hay High School) was renamed Charles Oakley Way in his honor.

He was inducted into the CIAA Hall of Fame in 2005 after his career at Virginia Union University.

Career highlights
He placed in the top ten in rebounds per game five times between 1987 and 1994 (second in 1987 and 1988).
Due to his durability he actually placed in the top ten in total rebounds 6 times and led the league in total rebounds twice (1987 and 1988). 
In 1994, he became an NBA All-Star and was chosen to the league's All-Defense 1st team.
Oakley currently ranks 25th all-time in NBA games played with 1,282 games, and 22nd all-time in career rebounds with 12,205 rebounds.

Personal life
In 2011, Oakley filed a lawsuit against the Aria Resort and Casino in Las Vegas, alleging a group assault by five security guards employed by the casino on May 28, 2010.

On July 30, 2016 Oakley married his wife Angela Reed.

Madison Square Garden arrest 
On February 8, 2017, Oakley was involved in an altercation at Madison Square Garden as the Knicks faced the visiting Los Angeles Clippers. According to the Knicks, Oakley was ejected from the arena after he is alleged to have yelled at James L. Dolan, the Executive Chairman of Madison Square Garden and MSG Networks, and refused to stop, an allegation he denies. There were also accounts of him hitting a security guard in his face and shoving another guard before being dragged away from the game and handcuffed. He was charged with three counts of misdemeanor assault and criminal trespassing. In a statement, the Knicks stated that Oakley "came to the game tonight and behaved in a highly inappropriate and completely abusive manner. He was ejected and was then arrested by the New York City Police Department."

In response, Oakley claimed that he sat down in his seat and he saw the Knicks owner James Dolan look at him and within four minutes he was being asked to leave the arena. He says that he didn't become combative until he was asked to leave for no apparent reason. While admitting "I shouldn't have put my hands on anyone," Oakley disputed the Knicks' rendition of events in an interview with ESPN's The Undefeated, which reported that Oakley says he "never said a word to Dolan" and "was minding his own business when he was confronted by Madison Square Garden Security, who asked why he was sitting so close to Dolan before demanding that he leave the building."

On February 13, 2017, NBA legend Michael Jordan and NBA commissioner Adam Silver met with both Dolan and Oakley at NBA headquarters. Oakley and Dolan both apologized for the fallout and both were currently negotiating a truce. "Both Mr. Oakley and Mr. Dolan were apologetic about the incident and subsequent comments, and their negative impact on the Knicks organization and the NBA," Silver said. The statement says Dolan hopes Oakley can return to MSG as his guest in the near future. On February 14, 2017, the ban from Madison Square Garden was lifted. On September 12, 2017, it was reported that Oakley was filing a civil lawsuit over the incident. As of February 2022, the suit was still in litigation, according to Oakley.

Oakley later retorted on March 11, 2019, that Dolan is someone who tries to bully everyone because he has money and power as an owner of the Knicks, quoting that "it doesn't make sense." He also admits he has very little reason to hold any reconciliation with Dolan, noting his relationship with the Knicks was frayed before the incident occurred (though he still bought himself tickets for Knicks games a few times each season before the incident), while also saying nothing was really resolved from his meeting with Adam Silver. Oakley further notes the incident caused a damaged relationship with the team, to the point where the possibility of his jersey being retired was in jeopardy. This all came out after Dolan threatened to ban a fan from the arena for yelling at him to "sell the team" a few days prior.

NBA career statistics

Regular season 

|-
| style="text-align:left;"| 
| style="text-align:left;"| Chicago
| 77 || 30 || 23.0 || .519 || .000 || .662 || 8.6 || 1.7 || .9 || .4 || 9.6
|-
| style="text-align:left;"| 
| style="text-align:left;"| Chicago
| 82 || 81 || 36.3 || .445 || .367 || .686 || 13.1 || 3.6 || 1.0 || .4 || 14.5
|-
| style="text-align:left;"| 
| style="text-align:left;"| Chicago
| 82 || 82 || 34.3 || .483 || .250 || .727 || 13.0 || 3.0 || .8 || .3 || 12.4
|-
| style="text-align:left;"| 
| style="text-align:left;"| New York
| 82 || 82 || 31.8 || .510 || .250 || .773 || 10.5 || 2.3 || 1.3 || .2 || 12.9
|-
| style="text-align:left;"| 
| style="text-align:left;"| New York
| 61 || 61 || 36.0 || .524 || .000 || .761 || 11.9 || 2.4 || 1.0 || .3 || 14.6
|-
| style="text-align:left;"| 
| style="text-align:left;"| New York
| 76 || 74 || 36.0 || .516 || .000 || .784 || 12.1 || 2.7 || .8 || .2 || 11.2
|-
| style="text-align:left;"| 
| style="text-align:left;"| New York
| 82 || 82 || 28.2 || .522 || .000 || .735 || 8.5 || 1.6 || .8 || .2 || 6.2
|-
| style="text-align:left;"| 
| style="text-align:left;"| New York
| 82 || 82 || 27.2 || .508 || .000 || .722 || 8.6 || 1.5 || 1.0 || .2 || 6.9
|-
| style="text-align:left;"| 
| style="text-align:left;"| New York
| 82 || 82 || 35.8 || .478 || .000 || .776 || 11.8 || 2.7 || 1.3 || .2 || 11.8
|-
| style="text-align:left;"| 
| style="text-align:left;"| New York
| 50 || 49 || 31.3 || .489 || .250 || .793 || 8.9 || 2.5 || 1.2 || .1 || 10.1
|-
| style="text-align:left;"| 
| style="text-align:left;"| New York
| 53 || 51 || 33.5 || .471 || .269 || .833 || 8.7 || 2.6 || 1.1 || .3 || 11.4
|-
| style="text-align:left;"| 
| style="text-align:left;"| New York
| 80 || 80 || 35.9 || .488 || .263 || .808 || 9.8 || 2.8 || 1.4 || .3 || 10.8
|-
| style="text-align:left;"| 
| style="text-align:left;"| New York
| 79 || 79 || 34.6 || .440 || .000 || .851 || 9.2 || 2.5 || 1.6 || .3 || 9.0
|-
| style="text-align:left;"| 
| style="text-align:left;"| Toronto
| 50 || 50 || 32.9 || .428 || .200 || .807 || 7.5 || 3.4 || .9 || .4 || 7.0
|-
| style="text-align:left;"| 
| style="text-align:left;"| Toronto
| 80 || 80 || 30.4 || .418 || .341 || .776 || 6.8 || 3.2 || 1.3 || .6 || 6.9
|-
| style="text-align:left;"| 
| style="text-align:left;"| Toronto
| 78 || 77 || 35.5 || .388 || .224 || .836 || 9.5 || 3.4 || 1.0 || .6 || 9.6
|-
| style="text-align:left;"| 
| style="text-align:left;"| Chicago
| 57 || 26 || 24.3 || .369 || .167 || .750 || 6.0 || 2.0 || .9 || .2 || 3.8
|-
| style="text-align:left;"| 
| style="text-align:left;"| Washington
| 42 || 1 || 12.2 || .418 || – || .824 || 2.5 || 1.0 || .3 || .1 || 1.8
|-
| style="text-align:left;"| 
| style="text-align:left;"| Houston
| 7 || 0 || 3.6 || .333 || – || .833 || .7 || .3 || .0 || .0 || 1.3
|- class="sortbottom"
| style="text-align:center;" colspan="2"| Career
| 1,282 || 1,159 || 31.4 || .471 || .253 || .761 || 9.5 || 2.5 || 1.1 || .3 || 9.7
|- class="sortbottom"
| style="text-align:center;" colspan="2"| All-Star
| 1 || 0 || 11.0 || .333 || – || – || 3.0 || 3.0 || .0 || .0 || 2.0

Playoffs 

|-
| style="text-align:left;"| 1986
| style="text-align:left;"| Chicago
| 3 || – || 29.3 || .524 || – || .615 || 10.0 || 1.0 || 2.0 || .7 || 10.0
|-
| style="text-align:left;"| 1987
| style="text-align:left;"| Chicago
| 3 || – || 43.0 || .380 || .500 || .833 || 15.3 || 2.0 || 1.3 || .3 || 20.0
|-
| style="text-align:left;"| 1988
| style="text-align:left;"| Chicago
| 10 || – || 37.3 || .440 || .000 || .875 || 12.8 || 3.2 || .6 || .4 || 10.1
|-
| style="text-align:left;"| 1989
| style="text-align:left;"| New York
| 9 || – || 33.2 || .479 || .500 || .667 || 11.2 || 1.2 || 1.3 || .1 || 9.7
|-
| style="text-align:left;"| 1990
| style="text-align:left;"| New York
| 10 || – || 33.6 || .512 || 1.000 || .654 || 11.0 || 2.7 || 1.1 || .2 || 12.1
|-
| style="text-align:left;"| 1991
| style="text-align:left;"| New York
| 3 || 3 || 33.3 || .476 || – || .500 || 10.3 || 1.0 || .7 || .3 || 7.7
|-
| style="text-align:left;"| 1992
| style="text-align:left;"| New York
| 12 || 12 || 29.5 || .379 || – || .741 || 9.0 || .7 || .7 || .4 || 5.3
|-
| style="text-align:left;"| 1993
| style="text-align:left;"| New York
| 15 || 15 || 33.8 || .481 || – || .727 || 11.0 || 1.1 || 1.1 || .1 || 11.1
|-
| style="text-align:left;"| 1994
| style="text-align:left;"| New York
| 25 || 25 || 39.7 || .477 || – || .775 || 11.7 || 2.4 || 1.4 || .2 || 13.2
|-
| style="text-align:left;"| 1995
| style="text-align:left;"| New York
| 11 || 11 || 38.3 || .450 || .400 || .824 || 8.5 || 3.7 || 1.7 || .5 || 13.1
|-
| style="text-align:left;"| 1996
| style="text-align:left;"| New York
| 8 || 8 || 38.5 || .500 || .333 || .694 || 8.6 || 1.8 || 1.0 || .0 || 13.1
|-
| style="text-align:left;"| 1997
| style="text-align:left;"| New York
| 10 || 10 || 35.8 || .442 || .000 || .759 || 8.8 || 1.6 || 2.2 || .3 || 9.8
|-
| style="text-align:left;"| 1998
| style="text-align:left;"| New York
| 10 || 10 || 34.2 || .408 || – || .920 || 8.5 || 1.4 || 1.1 || .2 || 8.1
|-
| style="text-align:left;"| 2000
| style="text-align:left;"| Toronto
| 3 || 3 || 36.7 || .483 || .286 || .000 || 7.7 || 3.7 || 2.0 || .3 || 10.0
|-
| style="text-align:left;"| 2001
| style="text-align:left;"| Toronto
| 12 || 12 || 32.6 || .435 || .375 || .824 || 6.3 || 1.8 || 1.0 || .6 || 9.3
|- class="sortbottom"
| style="text-align:center;" colspan="2"| Career
| 144 || – || 35.5 || .459 || .366 || .755 || 10.0 || 2.0 || 1.2 || .3 || 10.8

See also

List of National Basketball Association career games played leaders
List of National Basketball Association career rebounding leaders
List of National Basketball Association career turnovers leaders
List of National Basketball Association career minutes played leaders
List of National Basketball Association career playoff rebounding leaders
List of National Basketball Association players with most rebounds in a game
List of National Basketball Association seasons played leaders
List of oldest and youngest National Basketball Association players

References

External links

1963 births
Living people
African-American basketball coaches
African-American basketball players
American expatriate basketball people in Canada
American men's basketball players
Basketball players from Cleveland
Big3 coaches
Big3 players
Charlotte Bobcats assistant coaches
Chicago Bulls players
Cleveland Cavaliers draft picks
Houston Rockets players
National Basketball Association All-Stars
New York Knicks players
Power forwards (basketball)
Sportspeople from Cleveland
Toronto Raptors players
Virginia Union Panthers men's basketball players
Washington Wizards players
21st-century African-American people
20th-century African-American sportspeople
American men's 3x3 basketball players